Combressol is a commune in the Corrèze department in central France.

Geography
The Luzège forms the commune's western boundary.

Population

See also
Communes of the Corrèze department

References

Communes of Corrèze